James Michael Russell is an American paleoclimatologist and climatologist. He is the Royce Family Professor of Teaching Excellence and a Professor of Earth, Environmental, and Planetary Sciences at Brown University. Russell researches the climate, paleoclimate, and limnology.

Education 
Russell received a B.A. in Earth and Environmental Science from Wesleyan University in 1998. Russell then worked as a Junior Scientist at the Limnological Research Center at the University of Minnesota for one year before beginning his Ph.D. in Ecology at the University of Minnesota. Russell's dissertation in 2004 was titled The Holocene Paleolimnology and Paleoclimatology of Lake Edward, Uganda-Congo.

Career and research 
Russell is a paleoclimatologist and climatologist. After graduating from the University of Minnesota, Russell joined the Large Lakes Observatory at the University of Minnesota Duluth. In 2006, Russell joined the faculty of Brown University, where he was awarded tenure and the Royce Family Professorship of Teaching Excellence, in recognition of his teaching ability in 2018. 

Russell's primary fields are paleoclimatology, paleolimnology, and paleoecology. He is particularly well known for his work reconstructing climates from Tropical lake sediments.

According to Scopus, he has published 113 research articles so far with 37366 citations and has an H-index of 32.

Editorial activities 
 2017-2020: Associate Editor for Paleoceanography and Paleoclimatology.
 2016-present: Editorial board member for Quaternary International.

Academic honors 

 2008-2011: Joukowsky Family Assistant Professorship in Geological Sciences.
 2013-present: Chairman of the Board of Directors, Drilling, Observation, and Sampling of the Earth’s Continental Crust (DOSECC).

Notable Student and Postdoctoral Advisees

Postdocs
 Jacquelyn Gill (2012-2013)
 Sarah Ivory (2014-2016)
 Sylvia G. Dee (2015-2017)

Students 
Jessica Tierney (Ph.D. 2010)
Shannon Loomis (Ph.D. 2013)
Bronwen Konecky (Ph.D. 2013)
Jessica Rodysill (Ph.D. 2013)
Satrio Wicaksono (Ph.D. 2016)
William C. Daniels (Ph.D. 2017)

Selected works

Books 

 Climate-Driven Ecosystem Succession in the Sahara: the past 6000 years.

Journal articles 
 Climate-driven ecosystem succession in the Sahara: the past 6000 years.
 Northern hemisphere controls on tropical southeast African climate during the past 60,000 years.
 Classification of lacustrine sediments based on sedimentary components.

References

External links
 

Living people
Paleoclimatologists
American climatologists
Brown University faculty
University of Minnesota alumni
University of Minnesota Duluth faculty
21st-century American scientists
Year of birth missing (living people)